Gerald R. Eaves (born May 17, 1939, in Miami, Arizona) is a former California State Assemblyman who served from 1984 until 1992. He served on the Rialto City Council from 1977 until 1980 and as Mayor of Rialto from 1980 until 1984. After leaving the Assembly, he served on the San Bernardino County Board of Supervisors from 1992 until 2000.

References

External links
 Join California Jerry Eaves

1939 births
Living people
Members of the California State Assembly
People from Rialto, California
People from Miami, Arizona
California city council members
Mayors of places in California